is a college of technology in Nago, Japan. Its abbreviated name is NIT-Ok (Japanese: 沖縄高専; Okinawa Kōsen).

History
The Institute's opening ceremony came on 2009 April 10. On 2009 April 21 a University - Industry Cooperation Committee was established. The Advanced Course was founded in 2009.

In 2011 April a technical support center established, followed in 2012 April by a Regional Joint Techno Center.

In 2014 March 21 the first graduation ceremony was held.

In 2019 April, the Development Program of Aeronautical Engineering was founded.

Curricula
The school splits into Main and Advanced courses.

Main Course

(MS)
(IC)
(MI)
(BR)

About 40 students are enrolled in each department every year.
Students take general curriculum courses along with specialized courses relevant to the department.
Graduates receive the title of "associate degree" after completion.

Advanced Course
 
 
 
 

Each course corresponds to the departments of the Main Course.

Features 
Students are required to have a laptop.

Wi-Fi is available across the college.

Most student assignments and evaluations are online.

Facilities

Lecture rooms, experiment rooms and faculty research rooms 
Most lectures are carried out there.

Admin office, library, health room, meeting rooms, student counseling room, cafeteria, student council room, and alumni association room.
Audio-visual-hall. Used for lectures and gatherings.

Library

The library has around 69,000 books.
The library has books mainly on engineering, natural sciences and skill development.

Cafeteria

The common area is accessible to students and faculty.

The building is for the Department of Biological Resources.

References

Engineering universities and colleges in Japan
Universities and colleges in Okinawa Prefecture
Educational institutions established in 2009
2009 establishments in Japan
Japan-related articles by importance